Nanjai Gobi is a panchayat village in Gobichettipalayam taluk in Erode District of Tamil Nadu state, India. It is about 6 km from Gobichettipalayam and 36 km from district headquarters Erode. The village is located on the road connecting Gobichettipalayam with Athani, Tamil Nadu. Nanjai Gobi has a population of about 1589.

References

Villages in Erode district